Fred Housego (born 25 October 1944, Dundee, Scotland) is a former London taxi driver who became a television and radio personality and presenter after winning the BBC television quiz Mastermind in 1980. He did not give up his taxi licence when he began his media career and was still driving a cab in 2007.

Early life and career
Housego was educated at Kynaston Comprehensive School, where he passed one GCE O-level, in British Constitution. In addition to driving a taxi he has also worked as a messenger for an advertising agency, a postman and a registered London Tourist Board tour guide.

Mastermind
In 1980 Housego won a series of Mastermind in front of 18 million viewers. In an interview with Bradley Walsh for Come on Down! The Game Show Story, he said that his knowledge came from being a London Tourist Board-registered tour guide.

In 1981 Housego took part in the international version of Mastermind in Sydney, Australia. He again used The Tower of London as his subject in the competition, having previously used it as his subject in the Mastermind final. He came fourth with 16 points.

Television and radio
Housego's specialist subject in the final of Mastermind was 'The Tower of London'. Apart from Mastermind, his television appearances include Blankety Blank, The Pyramid Game, History On Your Doorstep, the Six O'Clock Show (on which he was a presenter) and This is Your Life.

However it is radio where Housego has spent most of his broadcasting career, and he became the host of an all-night radio phone-in show, in London, on LBC for many years during the 1990s. He also presented an LBC series about radio comedy during the same period. More recently he has been heard on BBC Radio 4 presenting a documentary and on various Radio 4 panel games and quizzes such as  Who Goes There? (2000). He has also appeared on Start the Week and as a contestant on Round Britain Quiz on BBC Radio 4.

He was the 'phone a friend' of Angela Rippon on Who Wants to Be a Millionaire?. Housego was asked in which month St Crispin's Day was but chose April despite being born on St Crispin's Day, which is in October.

Housego was the Pye TV Personality of the Year in 1981 and spoke to the Oxford and Cambridge Unions. He is a keen West Ham United supporter and has made several appearances at the ground during half-time presenting awards.

Personal life
Housego lives with his wife, Pat, in Pevensey Bay, East Sussex, England. In 2007 he was still working as a taxi driver. Housego suffers from diabetes and became overweight but by exercise and diet lost  in six months.

Publication
Housego has written a book entitled London: a portrait of Britain's historic capital, which was published by Hamlyn in 1982.

References

External links
 

British radio presenters
British television presenters
Contestants on British game shows
British taxi drivers
Taxis of London
People from Dundee
1944 births
Living people
Writers from Dundee
People from Pevensey